The 100th Separate Guards Motorized Rifle Order of Republic Brigade is military unit of 1st Army Corps, that forms the army of the Donetsk People's Republic. Serving as an element under the 1st Army Corps of the DPR's Ministry of Defence, it is tasked with defence of its assigned territories using rapid reaction, reconnaissance and spetsnaz components.

The unit was established as Republican Guard of the DPR (Республиканская гвардия ДНР) on January 12, 2015. On August 15, 2015 it was renamed as 100th Separate Motorized Rifle Brigade as a Russian military unit № 08826 (в/ч 08826).

The DPR RG was commanded by Major General Ivan Kondratov, who was arrested in September 2018.

History 
It was created by DPR leader Alexander Zakharchenko on January 12, 2015. On August 15, 2015, the Republican Guard became subordinate to the First Army Corps of the Ministry of Defense of the DPR. It received its battle banner on September 18, 2015. The 100th Separate Motorized Rifle Brigade was based in Olenika to Donetsk City.  In September 2022, the 100th Separate Motorized Rifle Brigade reportedly began recruiting prisoners from prisons across Donetsk.

One of Its Units the Pyatnashka battalion (the fifteeners) named after the first 15 volunteers in Donetsk. Its leader Akhrik Avidzba, a veteran of the Abkhazian conflict was one of those 15. The Pyatnashka defended a checkpoint in Stratonahtiv street just south of the international airport where heavy fighting was ongoing.

Organization
Many units of the Republican Guard had been in 2016 reformed into the 100th Separate Motorized Rifle Brigade.. The 100th Separate Motorized Rifle Brigade was formed as a rapid reaction force with Nine Battalion tactical groups, two independent companies, and one separate battalion with a combined size of between 3,000-5,000. the two Sperate companies include a reconnaissance battalion nicknamed "Patriot" based in Oleksandrivka and the Viking company. The 8th BTG nicknamed Paynashka is a mainly Abkhazian Volunteer battalion called "Pyatnashka". The 100th Separate Motorized Rifle Brigade defended the area of the front line going from Olenivka, Kalmiuske Raion, Donetsk Oblast to Donetsk International Airport.

Units
 1st BTG
 2nd BTG "Oplot"
 3rd BTG
 4th BTG "Cheburashka 
 5th BTG "Varyag 
 6th BTG 
 7th BTG
 8th BTG "Pyatnashka"
 9th BTG
 Patriot Company
 Viking Company 
 Separate battalion of special purpose

Battles 
It took part in the Battle of Marinka.

In the January 2017 Battle of Avdiivka, the losses of the 1st Battalion of the 100th Brigade were estimated at nine killed and up to thirty wounded, among whom was Ivan Balakay, a combatant nicknamed "Greek".

References 

Separatist forces of the war in Donbas
Military units and formations established in 2015
Military of the Donetsk People's Republic